Alexis Merizalde Knapp (born July 31, 1989) is an American actress. She portrayed Stacie Conrad in the Pitch Perfect film series (2012–2017), Alexis in the party film Project X (2012), and appeared on the first season of the TBS comedy Ground Floor.

Early life
Knapp was born in Avonmore, Pennsylvania, the daughter of Marjorie and Bradford Elwood Knapp. She grew up in North Carolina before moving to Los Angeles when she was 18.

Career
At age 18, Knapp moved to Los Angeles. There in 2008 she hosted a popular internet video series titled 'Project Lore', a show about the video game World of Warcraft, and also worked as a model before breaking into acting. She appeared in background roles in Percy Jackson & the Olympians: The Lightning Thief as Aphrodite Girl #9 and in Couples Retreat as a Dance Academy Girl. In 2012, Knapp appeared in her first major roles, playing Alexis in Project X, and as Stacie Conrad in the hit film Pitch Perfect, a sex-crazed Barden Bella. She reprised her role in the latter's 2015 sequel, with a brief cameo in the 2017 sequel.

Knapp appeared in the pilot of ABC's short-lived series Super Fun Night, written by and starring her Pitch Perfect co-star Rebel Wilson. She starred in the Tom Vaughan directed film So Undercover, as Taylor Jaffe. Knapp had a starring role in the first season of the TBS comedy, Ground Floor, portraying Tori, a party girl, who catches up on her sleep at work the next morning, but her character was dropped before the second season. She was cast in the Lifetime pilot Cinnamon Girl, which did not get picked up as a series. Knapp also starred in the independent short film Wracked, as Melissa. In 2017, she starred as Samantha in the Lifetime Christmas television film My Christmas Prince.

Personal life
Knapp dated actor Ryan Phillippe in mid-2010. The relationship ended that September. After their breakup, Knapp discovered that she was pregnant. She gave birth to their daughter in 2011; Phillippe was present during the birth.

Filmography

Film

Television

References

External links
 
 

1989 births
Living people
People from Westmoreland County, Pennsylvania
21st-century American actresses
Actresses from Pennsylvania
American film actresses
American television actresses